The 1998 Doc Martens Premier League was a  professional non-ranking snooker tournament that was played from 3 January to 24 May 1998. All matches including the play-offs were played at the Diamond Centre at Irthlingborough.

Ken Doherty won in the final 10–2 against Jimmy White. Stephen Hendry made a maximum break in the semi-finals against Doherty.


League phase

Top four qualified for the play-offs. If points were level then most frames won determined their positions. If two players had an identical record then the result in their match determined their positions. If that ended 4–4 then the player who got to four first was higher.

 4th January Match Day 1
  Ken Doherty 6–2 Mark Williams
  John Higgins 7–1 Jimmy White
  Stephen Hendry 7–1 Steve Davis
 3rd January Match Day 2
 Stephen Hendry 6–2 Mark Williams
 Steve Davis 5–3 Jimmy White
 John Higgins 6–2 Ronnie O'Sullivan
 Match Day 3
 Mark Williams 4–4 Steve Davis
 Jimmy White 6–2 Ken Doherty
 Match Day 4
 Ken Doherty 7–1 Ronnie O'Sullivan
 John Higgins 7–1 Mark Williams
 Stephen Hendry 5–3 Jimmy White
 Match Day 5
 Jimmy White 5–3 Ronnie O'Sullivan
 Ken Doherty 5–3 Steve Davis
 Stephen Hendry 4–4 John Higgins
 Match Day 6
 Ronnie O'Sullivan 5–3 Mark Williams
 Stephen Hendry 6–2 Ken Doherty
 Match Day 7
 Mark Williams 4–4 Jimmy White
 John Higgins 8–0 Steve Davis
 Stephen Hendry 4–4 Ronnie O'Sullivan
 Match Day 8
 John Higgins 4–4 Ken Doherty
 ''Steve Davis 4–4 Ronnie O'Sullivan

Play-offs 
23–24 May (Diamond Centre, Irthlingborough, England)

References

Premier League Snooker
1998 in snooker
1998 in British sport